"I'm on Fire" is a 1984 song and the fourth single of Bruce Springsteen's album Born in the USA.

I'm on Fire may also refer to:

 "I'm on Fire" (5000 Volts song), 1975 
 "I'm on Fire", a song from Barry White's 1979 album The Message Is Love
 "I'm on Fire" (Dwight Twilley Band song), 1975
 "I'm on Fire", a 2007 song by The Furze
 "I'm on Fire", a 1986 song by Guana Batz
 "I'm on Fire", a 1965 song by Jerry Lee Lewis
 "I'm on Fire", a song from Nico Vega's 2014 album, Lead to Light
 "I'm on Fire", a song from Marianne Faithfull's 2002 album Kissin Time
 "I'm on Fire"  a song from Mystikal's 1998 album, Ghetto Fabulous
 "I'm on Fire", a 2011 song by Porter Robinson
 "I'm on Fire", a song from Rascal Flatts's 2014 album Rewind
 "I'm on Fire", a song from Slightly Stoopid's 2012 album Top of the World
 "I'm on Fire", a song from Stateless's 2011 album, Matilda
 "I'm on Fire", a song from Virgin Steele's 1985 album, Noble Savage
 "I'm on Fire", a song from We Are Messengers's 2016 eponymous debut album